The 1999–2000 Cypriot Fourth Division was the 15th season of the Cypriot fourth-level football league. MEAP Nisou won their 1st title.

Format
Fourteen teams participated in the 1999–2000 Cypriot Fourth Division. All teams played against each other twice, once at their home and once away. The team with the most points at the end of the season crowned champions. The first three teams were promoted to the 2000–01 Cypriot Third Division and the last three teams were relegated to regional leagues.

However, in the summer, after the end of the championship, Evagoras Paphos merged with APOP Paphos to form AEP Paphos (AEP took the place of APOP in the 2000–01 Cypriot First Division. Because of this, playoffs between the bottom three teams of the 1999–2000 Cypriot Second Division and the fourth team of the 1999–2000 Cypriot Third Division were held for the extra place in the 2000–01 Cypriot Second Division. Also, playoffs between the bottom three teams of the 1999–2000 Cypriot Third Division and the fourth team of the 1999–2000 Cypriot Fourth Division were held for the extra place in the 2000–01 Cypriot Third Division.

Point system
Teams received three points for a win, one point for a draw and zero points for a loss.

Changes from previous season
Teams promoted to 1999–2000 Cypriot Third Division
 THOI Lakatamia
 Kinyras Empas
 Ellinismos Akakiou

Teams relegated from 1998–99 Cypriot Third Division
 APEP Pelendriou
 ATE PEK Ergaton
 Elia Lythrodonta

Teams promoted from regional leagues
 PAOK Kalou Choriou
 Elpida Xylofagou
 PEFO Olympiakos

Teams relegated to regional leagues
 Anagennisi Prosfigon Lemesou
 AOL Omonia Lakatamias
 Poseidonas Giolou
 Evagoras Kato Amiantos

League standings

Results

See also
 Cypriot Fourth Division
 1999–2000 Cypriot First Division
 1999–2000 Cypriot Cup

Sources

Cypriot Fourth Division seasons
Cyprus
1999–2000 in Cypriot football